Lweendo Chisamu  (born 25 February 1996) is a Zambian footballer who plays as a midfielder for the Zambia women's national football team. She was part of the team at the 2014 African Women's Championship. At the club level she played for Chibolya Queens in Zambia.

References

1996 births
Living people
Zambian women's footballers
Zambia women's international footballers
Place of birth missing (living people)
Women's association football midfielders